The Melbourne Cup was a film about the two mile horse race won by Newhaven which took place on Tuesday, 3 November 1896.

Marius Sestier filmed the 1896 Melbourne Cup horse race, being in a series of films about the Melbourne Cup Carnival. The feature, which consisted of 10 one-minute films shown in chronological order, was premiered at the Princess Theatre, Melbourne on 19 November 1896.

One or more of the films was actually shot on Derby Day, Saturday, 31 October 1896, when Newhaven won the Victoria Derby.

It has been acclaimed as the main part of Australia’s first locally produced and successfully screened cinema program.

Synopsis
Arrival of Train at the Hill platform on the Flemington Racecourse railway station. Crowds on the Lawn near the Grandstand. The arrival of the Governor Lord Brassey. Horses in the Saddling Paddock. Finish of the Cup Day Hurdle Race. Weighing-out for the Cup. The race finish. Lady Brassey placing the Blue Ribbon on Newhaven (this was reported on the Saturday when Newhaven won the Victoria Derby). Afternoon Tea under the Awning. Newhaven with his trainer W. Hickenbotham, and Jockey H. J. Gardiner.

List of the Melbourne Cup Carnival film reels
Arrival of race goers at the Hill platform on the Flemington Racecourse railway station
The lawn near the band stand
The Arrival of his Excellency the Governor
Horses in the Saddling Paddock
Lady Brassey placing the Blue Ribbon on Newhaven
Finish of the Cup Day Hurdle Race
Weighing-out for the Cup
The Melbourne Cup, the race finish
Near the grandstand
Afternoon Tea under the Awning
Newhaven with his trainer W. Hickenbotham, and Jockey H. J. Gardiner

References

External links

1890s Australian films
1890s short documentary films
1896 films
Australian short documentary films
Australian horse racing films
Australian silent short films
Australian black-and-white films
Films about horses
Melbourne Cup